The 1969 New York Giants season was the franchise's 45th season in the National Football League (NFL). The Giants moved back to the Century Division in 1969, after one season in the Capitol Division. They finished with a 6–8 record, and had one victory less than the previous year. New York placed second in the Century Division, four-and-a-half games behind the Cleveland Browns.

Before the season, the Giants selected Fred Dryer in the first round of the 1969 NFL/AFL Draft, with the thirteenth overall pick, and traded with the Atlanta Falcons for running back Junior Coffey in late October. New York lost all of its preseason games, including a 37–14 rout by the New York Jets at the Yale Bowl in New Haven, leading the team to fire head coach Allie Sherman in mid-September, a week before the regular season began. Offensive backfield coach Alex Webster was promoted to head coach.

The Giants opened the season with a one-point win over the Minnesota Vikings, the eventual league champion, and held a 3–1 record after four games. However, they went on a seven-game losing streak, then won the final three games in December to close the season.

Roster

Schedule

Game summaries

Week 3 vs. Steelers

Standings

References 

1960s in the Bronx
New York Giants
New York Giants
New York Giants seasons